Andrew Daniel Divoff (born July 2, 1955) is a Venezuela-born American actor and producer.

Divoff has played many villains in film and on television, including drug cartel leaders, terrorists, and organized crime bosses, though he is best known for playing the evil Djinn/Nathaniel Demerest in the first two Wishmaster films. Other noteworthy film and television roles include the villains Luis Cali in Toy Soldiers, Cherry Ganz in Another 48 Hrs., Ernesto Mendoza in A Low Down Dirty Shame, Boris Bazylev in Air Force One, M (short for as Mephistopheles) in Faust: Love of the Damned, Ivan Sarnoff in CSI: Miami, Mikhail Bakunin in Lost, and Karakurt in The Blacklist.

Divoff can speak eight languages: Spanish, Portuguese, Catalan, French, Italian, English, German, and Russian. At one time he also knew Romanian, but forgot it through lack of use. Divoff's multilingual skills are showcased in many of his film and television roles.

Early life and education
Divoff was born in San Tomé, Anzoátegui, Venezuela. His father was Russian. His parents worked as wildcatters for Exxon, and met because Divoff's maternal grandfather was his father's supervisor. Divoff describes himself as having been an introvert and an outsider during his childhood in Caracas, Venezuela, stating that he had experienced near-daily physical altercations and bullying from other children. Divoff's first language was Spanish, but he learned English while still living in Venezuela.

After Divoff's parents divorced, he emigrated with his sister and mother to northern California when he was 10 years old. Upon moving to the United States, Divoff was supposed to enter the fifth grade, but the school principal held Divoff back because of his heavy accent. Divoff states that this experience was a catalyst for his obsession with languages. When he was in the seventh grade, Divoff's school screened films in class, including Seven Days in May, which Divoff found inspiring. As a result, Divoff began envisioning himself as the hero in such films, and told his friends that he wanted to become an actor who did his own stunts.

Divoff's mother worked for the State Department, and he moved with her when she was transferred to Spain. Divoff lived five years in Vilassar de Mar (Catalonia), between 1973 and 1977, feeling himself to be Catalan too. While in Spain, Divoff tutored English-speaking students in Spanish and attended the University of Barcelona, where he completed a research project on linguistics in The Canterbury Tales. He transferred his credits to Georgetown University, where he continued his study of languages and linguistics, and has resided in the United States ever since. Divoff did not graduate from Georgetown University, instead deciding to take a year off to help his father settle in California for retirement.

Career
After returning to California, Divoff worked as a dispatcher for a limousine company, eventually becoming a limo driver in 1983. During his evenings off, Divoff took acting lessons; his teachers included Milton Katselas, director of Butterflies are Free. His first role was that of a Russian guard for a 1986 episode of Misfits of Science. Divoff won the role via a telephone audition, in which was asked to scream, "Stop that truck!" in Russian and then in English with a Russian accent. His first film role was in the 1986 cult horror film Neon Maniacs, in which he played a demonic surgeon. Divoff had a falling out with the filmmakers due to what he believed constituted animal abuse: real dead pigeons were used in one of the film's scenes.

Divoff's subsequent TV appearances in the 1980s included bit parts and work as an extra in The A-Team, The Twilight Zone, MacGyver, Scarecrow and Mrs. King, and Matlock. His multilingual skills and international background helped win him some of these early roles. When auditioning for a guest role as a limo driver for Thirtysomething, Divoff pretended to be a Russian immigrant, and maintained the farce on set until the filming ended, dropping the Russian accent entirely.

His breakthrough role came in 1990, when he was cast as the outlaw biker "Cherry Ganz" in Another 48 Hrs. He was vacationing in Berlin when he received the call that he won the role. He went out to celebrate at a nearby pub and then attended the tearing down of the Berlin Wall, grabbing a sledgehammer and participating in the Wall's destruction. Divoff marks Another 48 Hrs. as the film that allowed him to quit his limo driving job and focus on acting. Following Another 48 Hours, Divoff landed antagonist roles in other significant projects, primarily in the action genre. These projects included Toy Soldiers and A Low Down Dirty Shame. In rare instances, Divoff portrayed the protagonist or hero, such as in Running Cool and Interceptor.

In 1997, Air Force One and Wishmaster were released. In his portrayal of a Russian terrorist henchman in Air Force One, as in other films, Divoff performed his own stunts. Divoff stated in an interview that he has performed his own stunts so frequently that it is often assumed that he used to be a professional stuntman; however, this is not the case. He simply preferred to perform his own stunts because it gave him complete control over every aspect of his characters.

Divoff played the nefarious "Djinn" in the first two films of the Wishmaster series. Wishmaster was directed by special effects artist Robert Kurtzman, and featured cameo appearances by several popular horror actors. Divoff reprised the role as the Djinn in Wishmaster 2: Evil Never Dies, directed by Jack Sholder. In 1999, Divoff and a friend penned a script for a third film, Wishmaster: The Third Millennium, which had a Y2K theme involving "American warship in Asia and it is hit by a missile, and all hell breaks loose. Incidentally, there is a meeting going on at the UN and monsters come to life right there and go through the crowd and start ripping it up." Divoff's script also required lavish special effects, and featured "gargoyles on buildings coming to life and coming down into the street." Divoff's script wasn't optioned, and he ultimately did not return for Wishmaster 3 or Wishmaster 4, saying he believed those projects did not have the capacity for impressive special effects due to a significantly lower budget, and because he felt that these sequels didn't have the love for the franchise of the earlier entries.

Divoff later reunited with Robert Kurtzman for the "grindhouse"- inspired horror film The Rage, and has since appeared in several other horror films, including the Midnight Syndicate's indie horror flick The Dead Matter as the lead villain.  in The Hatred as a former Nazi, and in the Miles Doleac film Demons as a religious zealot.

Divoff had a recurring role on Lost (Seasons 3 and 6, 2006–07 and 2010 respectively) as Mikhail Bakunin, a Russian member of the Others who lived in the Flame station of the DHARMA Initiative (in the episodes "The Cost of Living", "Enter 77" and "Par Avion") and later appeared, in flashback (in "One of Us"), and then reappeared (in the episodes "D.O.C.", "The Man Behind the Curtain", "Through the Looking Glass", and "The Package").

In 2008–09, on Season 7 of CSI: Miami, Divoff played "Ivan Sarnoff" in four episodes ("Seeing Red", "Target Specific", "And They're Offed", and "Raging Cannibal"). In 2015–16, Divoff had a recurring role as Karakurt in six episodes of Season 3 of The Blacklist (episodes "The Djinn", "Sir Crispin Crandall", "Zal Bin Hasaan", "Kings of the Highway", "The Director", and "The Director: Conclusion"). Other television guest appearances include roles on The A-Team, JAG, Highlander: The Series, Walker, Texas Ranger, Criminal Minds, Law & Order: Special Victims Unit, Burn Notice, Alias, Nikita, The Strain, and Colony.

Other business ventures and philanthropy
Divoff has pursued a number of other business ventures in addition to professional acting, and uses many of these businesses as a springboard for philanthropic and environmentalist efforts. In the early 1990s, he was a co-owner of the blues bar and restaurant Sunset Social Club.

Divoff is passionate about environmental issues and water rights, and believes that the best form of activism is simply to help people in need. Several years after his move from actor William Boyd's former home in Hollywood to the Lake Arrowhead region of the San Bernardino Mountains in 1992, Divoff formed a logging crew during a time when he described acting opportunities as scarce. Divoff and his crew focused on removing trees that were dead or dying due to a pine beetle infestation. Divoff later became a partner in Verdant Resource and in Alpine Village Water Company that serves a nearby mountain community. Verdant Resource holds a patent for a wind-powered water pump. With the help of a government grant, Divoff and the other partners at the water company provided running water to a small community using Verdant's pump technology.

in 2014, Divoff developed his own craft beer, the Djinn's Hellabrew, which he has sold to benefit charities, including Smile Train, Operation Provider, and the Hollywood Police Activities League. In 2017, Divoff formed his own brewing company, Three Marm Brewing, a "marm" being the part of a tree trunk that forks into two or more trunks. The partners of Three Marm Brewing are predominantly members of Divoff's former logging crew. Divoff and his partners are planning to open a taproom in Crestline, California, and have other new beer flavors in development, including the Logger Lager and Mystic Mast Stout.

Personal life
Divoff was married to Russian actress Raissa Danilova. His hobbies include sculpting and oil-painting.

Filmography

Film

Video games

Television

References

External links
Official website

Three Marm Brewing

1955 births
Living people
People from Anzoátegui
Venezuelan people of Russian descent
Venezuelan male television actors
Venezuelan male film actors
Venezuelan expatriates in the United States